"Only Way" is a song by Australian contemporary worship band Planetshakers. It was released on March 8, 2019, as the lead single from their live album, Rain (2019). The song was written by Joth Hunt and Samantha Evans. It appeared on the EP Rain, Part 2.

Background
In January 2019, Joth Hunt was diagnosed with cancer, and due to his illness he wrote the songs "Only Way" and "God Is On The Throne" victory and faith declaration songs about Hunt's situation. After 10 days the doctor performed an operation in which after further analysis the cancer appeared to have been cured.

Critical reception

Joshua Andre of 365 Days of Inspiring Media said "Probably the most personal and emotional song that Planetshakers have ever recorded, "Only Way" is an explosive guitar led pop/rock anthem, which released this month and is inspired by the tumultuous ordeal of lead singer Joth Hunt's surgery to remove a cancerous tumor early last year. With Joth in the midst of a desperate situation, "Only Way" was born, and like Joth has been give comfort by his own song; so too does he want others in Australia and in the entire world to be impacted by God moving in his own life."

Music videos
The official music video for the song was released on March 6, 2019 and has garnered over 2,7 million views as of January 2021.

Charts

Release history

References

2019 singles
2019 songs
Christian songs
Gospel songs
Contemporary Christian songs
Songs written by Joth Hunt
Planetshakers songs
Planetshakers Ministries International singles